NGC 1996 is an open cluster or a group of stars located in the Taurus constellation. It was discovered by William Herschel on December 7, 1785. NGC 1996 is located around 1400 pc (~ 4570 ly) from the Solar System and it is roughly 282 million years old and its apparent size is 22 arcmin.

References

Open clusters
1996
Taurus (constellation)
Astronomical objects discovered in 1785
Discoveries by William Herschel